Ulysses Simpson Grant III (July 4, 1881August 29, 1968) was a United States Army officer and planner. He was the son of Frederick Dent Grant, and the grandson of General of the Army and American President Ulysses S. Grant.

Early life and education
Grant was born in Chicago, as a grandson of President and General Ulysses S. Grant and educated in Austria, where his father was an American diplomat. He attended Columbia University until 1898 when he received an appointment to West Point. In July and August 1899, both Grant and Douglas MacArthur joined their first summer camp at West Point, and they were especially marked plebes for hazing by upperclassmen since they were the grandson and son, respectively, of well-known men (Ulysses S. Grant and Arthur MacArthur). Grant graduated sixth in his class in 1903 while Douglas MacArthur graduated first in that class.

Career
After his graduation from West Point, Grant was assigned to the Corps of Engineers of the United States Army and graduated from the U.S. Engineer School in 1908. He also served in the General Staff Corps from 1917 to 1920 and again from 1936 to 1940.

Grant served on Mindanao in the Philippines (1903–04); the Cuban Pacification (1906); the Mexican Border Service (1913–17), including the Veracruz Expedition (1914), and the Pancho Villa Expedition (1916); as well as in World War I and World War II.

In 1904 Grant served as an aide to President Theodore Roosevelt. Grant met his future wife while he was at the White House.

In 1907, Grant married Edith Ruth Root (1878–1962), the daughter of Elihu Root, the former Secretary of War and Secretary of State. They had three daughters: Edith, Clara Frances, and Julia.

During World War I, Grant was promoted to major. From 1918 to 1919, Major Grant served on the staff of General Tasker H. Bliss, the United States representative at the Supreme War Council at Versailles. Grant was the secretary of the American section. In 1918, he assisted in the treaty negotiations with Germany regarding the treatment of prisoners of war. In 1919, Grant served on President Woodrow Wilson's commission to negotiate peace in Paris.

Post-World War I
After the war, Grant returned to the United States and was the district engineer of the 2nd Engineer District in San Francisco. While in California, Grant also served on the California Debris Commission. On August 28, 1923, Grant made his first visit to the Sierra Nevada. The superintendent of General Grant National Park (now Kings Canyon National Park) invited Grant to see the park named after Grant's grandfather. Grant visited the General Grant Grove and the General Grant tree, a Giant Sequoia.

By 1923, Grant went to Washington, D.C. and was the executive officer of the Arlington Memorial Bridge Commission and a member of the National Capital Park and Planning Commission. In 1925, he was director of the newly created Office of Public Buildings and Public Parks of the National Capital (1925–1933). By 1927 he was promoted to lieutenant colonel, and was appointed as a co-director of the bicentennial celebration of the birth of George Washington. As the director of the parks in Washington, Grant also supervised the United States Park Police. Grant expanded the police, instituted plain-clothes patrols, and modernized the force with the addition of motorcycles and automobiles. Later, in 1928, Grant ordered the police to crack down on late-night "petters" in the parks.

In 1934, he graduated from the Army War College. He commanded the 1st Engineer Regiment at Fort DuPont, Delaware and the Delaware Civilian Conservation Corps District from 1934 to 1936. He was a full colonel by this time.

In 1936, Grant was the chief of staff of the Second Corps Area at Fort Jay, Governors Island, New York, an army post where his grandfather had stayed prior to his posting to California in 1854 and where his father commanded a department and was division commander until his death in 1912. While in New York, Grant, his wife, and her siblings and their spouses were present at the bedside of his father-in-law, Elihu Root, when he died in 1937.

In 1940, Grant was division engineer for the Great Lakes Engineer Division, headquartered in Cleveland, Ohio. He was promoted to brigadier general.

World War II
From 1941 to mid 1942, he commanded the Engineer Replacement Training Center at Fort Leonard Wood, Missouri. In July 1942, Grant was made chief of the Protection Branch of the Office of Civilian Defense in Washington, D.C.; he was in charge of the United States' civil defense and often traveled across the country in this capacity.

In 1943, Grant was promoted to major general.  In July 1945 he reached the mandatory retirement age of 64 and retired on 31st of the month.  The next day he was recalled to active duty and served until he became fully retired from the Army on July 15, 1946.

Post military career

After his retirement from the army, Grant again served on the National Capital Park and Planning Commission. He was vice president of George Washington University from 1946 to 1951. In addition, he also served as president of the American Planning and Civic Association from 1947 to 1949. He was also on the National Council of Historic Sites and a trustee of the National Trust for Historic Preservation.

Grant's testimony as a Corps of Engineers veteran before Congress in opposition to the Echo Park Dam in Dinosaur National Monument was a key element in the cancellation of the project, and in protection of national park lands against water development projects.

From 1952 to 1968, Grant served as president of the board of trustees of the Columbia Historical Society (now the Historical Society of Washington, D.C.). From 1957 to 1961, he was chairman of the Civil War Centennial Commission. He resigned from the Centennial Commission due to the illness of his wife and because of controversies that developed in planning commemorative events for the centennial of the American Civil War.

Memberships
Grant belonged to the Military Order of the Loyal Legion of the United States (MOLLUS), the Sons of Union Veterans of the Civil War (SUVCW) and the Aztec Club of 1847. He served as the Aztec Club's president for three non-consecutive terms from 1951 to 1952, 1953 to 1954 and 1955 to 1956. He served as commander-in-chief of MOLLUS from 1957 to 1961. He also served as commander-in-chief of the SUVCW from 1953 to 1955 and as national counselor of the SUVCW from 1961 until his death in 1968.  He is the only person to have served as the national president of all three organizations.

In 1912 he was elected to membership in the Empire State Society of the Sons of the American Revolution and was assigned SAR national membership number 24,174.  He was also an hereditary member of the Military Order of the Carabao in succession to his father who died in 1912.  He was also a member of the Order of the Founders and Patriots of America and served as the Order's Governor General.

In addition to the above organizations, Grant was also eligible for membership in the United Spanish War Veterans, Military Order of Foreign Wars, Military Order of the World Wars, Veterans of Foreign Wars and the American Legion.

Later life and death
After the death of his wife, General Grant remained at his home on the outskirts of Clinton, New York near Hamilton College.

In 1961, Grant received an honorary LL.D. degree from Hamilton College.

Grant died August 29, 1968, in Clinton, New York and was buried at the Hamilton College Cemetery near his father-in-law.

His cousin was Ulysses S. Grant IV, the son of Ulysses S. Grant, Jr.

Awards and decorations
   Distinguished Service Medal
   Legion of Merit
   Philippine Campaign Medal
   Army of Cuban Pacification Medal
   Mexican Service Medal
   World War I Victory Medal
   American Defense Service Medal
   American Campaign Medal
   World War II Victory Medal
   Companion of the Order of St Michael and St George (UK)
    Officier Légion d'honneur (France)
   Croix de Guerre (France)
   Order of Saints Maurice and Lazarus (Italy)

Dates of rank

Source: U.S. Army Register, 1946.

Bibliography
 "Washington, a Treasure of Opportunities." American Magazine of Art Vol. 22, May 1931.
 "Washington, a Planned City in Evolution." Journal of the American Institute of Architects Vol. 1, March 1944.
 "Major Problems in Planning a Worthy Capital for the Nation." Landscape Architecture Vol. 40, October 1949.
 "Here Comes the Greatest Centennial in U.S. History!" published in various newspapers October 1960.
 Ulysses S. Grant: Warrior and Statesman. (1969) William Morrow & Company, New York. This is a biography of his famous grandfather and was published posthumously.

See also

References

Further reading
 "Be Thou at Rest". Assembly Association of Graduates, U.S.M.A. Vol. 29, No. 3, Fall 1970, pp. 115–116.
 Los Angeles Times, various articles 1923–1961.
 Who's Who in America 1954–1955. Chicago: Marquis Who's Who.
 Who Was Who in America 1969–1973. Chicago: Marquis Who's Who.
 The National Cyclopaedia of American Biography. (1973) Vol. 54. New York: James T. White & Co., pp. 401–402.

External links

Generals of World War II

1881 births
1968 deaths
United States Army personnel of World War I
United States Army generals of World War II
Civilian Conservation Corps people
Columbia College (New York) alumni
Recipients of the Distinguished Service Medal (US Army)
Honorary Companions of the Order of St Michael and St George
Recipients of the Legion of Merit
United States Army generals
United States Military Academy alumni
Ulysses S. Grant
Grant family
George Washington University trustees
Recipients of the Croix de Guerre (France)
Officiers of the Légion d'honneur
Knights of the Order of Saints Maurice and Lazarus
United States Army War College alumni
Military personnel from Chicago
People from Clinton, Oneida County, New York
United States Army Corps of Engineers personnel
American military engineers
American expatriates in the Austro-Hungarian Empire